Anthony Peter Coll ( – 14 May 2020) was a New Zealand professional rugby league footballer and coach who represented New Zealand in three World Cups.

Early life and family
Coll grew up on the West Coast. He was the son of Peter Coll—a West Coast rugby league representative who played in the team that defeated the touring Great Britain side in 1946—and the uncle of squash player Paul Coll. He was educated at Marist Brothers High School, Greymouth.

Playing career
A West Coast representative, Coll played in 65 games (including 30 tests) for the New Zealand national rugby league team including three world cups. Coll trialled for the 1971 Kiwis unsuccessfully, however he was selected the following year. He was the Kiwis' captain at the 1977 World Cup.

Coll also had a brief spell in the Canterbury Rugby League competition, playing with Marist-Western Suburbs and representing Canterbury.

Later years
Coll coached the West Coast in 1986 and 1987.

He was made a New Zealand Rugby League "Legends of League" in 2007.

He ran a sports store in Greymouth. In 2011 Coll was elected to the Grey District Council in a by-election.

Coll suffered a heart attack in 2019. On 14 May 2020, he died aged 70 after suffering a second heart attack while biking near Karoro.

References

2020 deaths
Canterbury rugby league team players
Local politicians in New Zealand
Marist (West Coast) players
Marist-Western Suburbs players
New Zealand national rugby league team captains
New Zealand national rugby league team players
New Zealand rugby league coaches
New Zealand rugby league players
New Zealand sportsperson-politicians
Place of birth missing
Rugby league second-rows
South Island rugby league team players
West Coast rugby league team coaches
West Coast rugby league team players
Year of birth missing
People educated at John Paul II High School, Greymouth